Cima Piazzi, Cima de' Piazzi, del Piazzi or di Piazzi (3,439m) is the highest mountain of the Livigno Alps in Lombardy, Italy. It has a beautiful and imposing north face, which is covered with ice, and three long ridges, and is glaciated on all sides.

See also
 List of mountains of the Alps

References

Sources
Cima di Piazzi at Summitpost

Mountains of Lombardy
Mountains of the Alps
Alpine three-thousanders